XHPNX-FM is a radio station on 98.1 FM in Santiago Pinotepa Nacional, Oaxaca. It is part of CMI, the media company owned by the López Lena family, and carries the Ke Buena national format from Televisa Radio as well as CMI's Encuentro news programs.

History
XEPNX-AM 920 received its concession on June 15, 1990. It has always been owned by the López Lena family.

XEPNX received approval to migrate to FM in 2011.

References

Radio stations in Oaxaca